René Steurbaut (26 June 1928 – 6 January 2019) was a Belgian basketball player. He competed in the men's tournament at the 1948 Summer Olympics.

References

1928 births
2019 deaths
Belgian men's basketball players
Olympic basketball players of Belgium
Basketball players at the 1948 Summer Olympics
Sportspeople from Ghent